Miss Teen USA 2018, the 36th Miss Teen USA pageant, was held on May 18, 2018 at Hirsch Memorial Coliseum
in Shreveport, Louisiana. Sophia Dominguez-Heithoff of Missouri crowned Hailey Colborn of Kansas as her successor at the end of the event. She is the second entrant from Kansas to win the title after Keylee Sue Sanders won Miss Teen USA 1995.

For the first time, the pageant was held concurrently with its sister pageant Miss USA 2018, which was held three days later on May 21, also taking place in Shreveport.

Results

Order of Announcements

Top 15

 

Top 10

Top 5

Contestants
All 51 delegates have been confirmed:

Judges
Ashley Fox – sports journalist
Kalani Hilliker – dancer, actress, model, and reality television personality
Brittney Rogers Collins – reality television personality and Miss Louisiana USA 2003
Bia Roldan – journalist and news anchor
Crystle Stewart – television host, model, actress, and Miss USA 2008 from Texas
Marta Topran – beauty director at Seventeen, Cosmopolitan, and Women's Health

Notes

References

External links

 Miss Teen USA official website

2018
Beauty pageants in the United States
May 2018 events in the United States
2018 beauty pageants
2018 in Louisiana